Magnus Stålsvärd (1724–1756), was a Swedish officer. He was executed for treason as one of the conspirators participating in the failed coup d'etat of queen Louisa Ulrika, the Coup of 1756.

References
 Stålsvärd (Ståhlsverd), Magnus i Nordisk familjebok (andra upplagan, 1918)

1724 births
1756 deaths
Executed Swedish people
People executed by Sweden by decapitation
18th-century Swedish military personnel
18th-century executions by Sweden
People executed for treason against Sweden
Age of Liberty people